Kunnumpurathu Samuel was an Indian religious leader.

He was the Bishop of East Kerala; and Moderator of the Church of South India from 2000 to 2004.

Notes

21st-century Anglican bishops in India
Indian bishops
Anglican bishops of East Kerala
Indian Christian religious leaders
Moderators of the Church of South India